La Wally is a 1932 Italian musical drama film directed by Guido Brignone and starring Germana Paolieri, Isa Pola and Carlo Ninchi. It is an adaptation of the 1892 opera La Wally by Alfredo Catalani.

The film's sets were designed by Gastone Medin and Ivo Perilli.

Cast
 Germana Paolieri as Wally  
 Isa Pola as Afra 
 Carlo Ninchi as Hagenbach  
 Achille Majeroni as Strominger  
 Renzo Ricci as Vincenzo Gellner  
 Gino Sabbatini as Walter 
 Giuseppe Pierozzi as a farmer 
 Amedeo Trilli

See also
 The Vulture Wally (1921)
 La Leggenda di Wally (1930)
 The Vulture Wally (1940)
 The Vulture Wally (1956)

References

Bibliography 
 Poppi, Roberto. I registi: dal 1930 ai giorni nostri. Gremese Editore, 2002.

External links 
 

1930s musical drama films
Italian musical drama films
1930s historical musical films
Italian historical musical films
1932 films
1930s Italian-language films
Films directed by Guido Brignone
Films set in the 19th century
Films based on operas
Films set in the Alps
1932 drama films
1930s Italian films